Crow Summit is an unincorporated community in Jackson County, West Virginia, United States. Crow Summit once had a post office, which is now closed. The community was named after Michael Crow, an original owner of the town site.

References

Unincorporated communities in Jackson County, West Virginia
Unincorporated communities in West Virginia